Doña Carlota Joaquina Teresa Cayetana of Spain (25 April 1775 – 7 January 1830) was Queen of Portugal and Brazil as the wife of King Dom John VI. She was the daughter of King Don Charles IV of Spain and Maria Luisa of Parma.
                                                         
Detested by the Portuguese court — where she was called "the Shrew of Queluz" — Carlota Joaquina gradually won the antipathy of the people, who accused her of promiscuity and influencing her husband in favor of the interests of the Spanish crown. After the escape of the Portuguese court to Brazil, she began conspiring against her husband, claiming that he had no mental capacity to govern Portugal and its possessions, thus wanting to establish a regency. She also planned to usurp the Spanish crown that was in the hands of Napoleon's brother Joseph Bonaparte.
After the marriage in 1817 of her son Pedro with the Archduchess Leopoldina of Austria and the later return of the royal family to Portugal in 1821, Carlota Joaquina was confined in the Royal Palace of Queluz, where she died alone and abandoned by her children on 7 January 1830.

Life

Childhood

Born in the Royal Palace of Aranjuez on 25 April 1775 as the second (but eldest surviving) child of Charles, Prince of Asturias, and his wife Maria Luisa of Parma, she was baptized with the names of Carlota Joaquina Teresa Cayetana, but she was called only by her first name, Carlota, a name that honored both her father and paternal grandfather, King Charles III of Spain—Carlota was his favorite granddaughter. Despite the rigidity of her education and court etiquette, the Infanta was described as mischievous and playful.

She received a rigid and deeply Catholic education, with bases in the fields of study of religion, geography, painting, and riding (Carlota's favorite sport). The closed and austere temperament of the Spanish monarchy imposed on the family and on the whole court rigid norms of behavior and etiquette. King Charles III, a man of reserved behavior, devoted more time to his family than to the animations of the courtesan life, where his daughter-in-law Maria Luisa took an active part. Carlota's mother soon assumed the organization of entertainments at court, with luxurious parties, where morals were easily forgotten. Soon the Princess of Asturias' image would be linked to that of a promiscuous woman who betrayed her husband to other men. Among them, possibly, was the Prime Minister Manuel Godoy, whose alleged love affair was widely explored by the press at the time. Not even the successive pregnancies and long-hoped birth of a living male heir to the throne in 1784 saved Maria Luísa from the contempt of the population. She would go down in history as one of the most unpopular queens in Spain and her bad reputation deeply affected her children, especially Carlota, the firstborn daughter.

Marriage

The subject of Carlota Joaquina's marriage was arranged by both King Charles III and his sister Mariana Victoria, Dowager Queen of Portugal, in the late 1770s when Mariana went to Spain to encourage diplomatic relations between the estranged countries. Carlota Joaquina was to marry Infante John, Duke of Beja (youngest grandson of Mariana Victoria), and Infante Gabriel of Spain (Carlota Joaquina's paternal uncle) was to marry Infanta Mariana Vitória of Portugal (only surviving granddaughter and namesake of the Dowager Queen of Portugal).

Carlota's apprenticeship would be tested when she underwent a series of public examinations in front of the Spanish court and Portuguese ambassadors sent on behalf of Queen Maria I of Portugal to evaluate the qualities of the princess destined to marry her second son. In October 1785, the Gazeta of Lisbon published an account of the tests:

Having proven the talent of the bride, there was therefore no impediment to the union with the Portuguese prince, so on 8 May 1785 was celebrated the proxy marriage; three days later, on 11 May, the 10-year-old Carlota Joaquina and her retinue left Spain for Lisbon. On the day she left the Spanish court, Carlota Joaquina asked her mother to make a painting of her in a red dress to place on the wall, instead of the painting of Infanta Margaret Theresa of Spain (which Carlota Joaquina claimed to be more beautiful). As a part of the infanta cortege were Father Felipe Scio, famous Spanish theologian and scholar, Emília O'Dempsy, as lady-in-waiting, and Anna Miquelina, personal maid of Carlota Joaquina. The official wedding ceremony between Infante John of Portugal and Carlota Joaquina took place on 9 June 1785; she was only 10 years old while her husband was 18. Due to the bride's young age, the consummation of the union was delayed until 9 January 1790, when Carlota Joaquina was then able to conceive and bear children.

Life in the Portuguese court

Nevertheless, the climate in the Braganza court differed in many respects from that of the cheerful Spanish court. While in other parts of the Europe they represented the mark of a new society based on the Age of Enlightenment principles, in Portugal the Catholic Church still imposed norms prohibiting all types of amusement. The dramatization of comedies was banned, including the performance of dances and parties. The reign of Queen Maria I was marked by the rise of a conservative group of the nobility and clergy of Portugal; an extremely "boredom" environment, as defined by Dowager Queen Mariana Victoria (Carlota Joaquina's great-aunt). In this way, Carlota Joaquina found herself in the midst of a very religious and austere environment, in contrast to the extravagance and the faust to which she was accustomed. Despite this, her relationship with her mother-in-law was very tender, as the letters exchanged between them proved. The joy and vivacity of Carlota were responsible for the rare hours of relaxation of the Queen.

Her more liberal habits and customs differed in many ways from that of other women at court. Quite traditional in relation to female behavior, Portuguese men disapproved of the ease with which Carlota Joaquina transited in public space, her performance in the political field and her distemper in the family routine. Since most Portuguese women were deprived of social life, Carlota Joaquina's offending behavior allowed some malicious rumors about her in the court. Some of them were prejudiced, like the Duchess of Abrantès, wife of the French General Junot, who later invaded Portugal. During her time in Lisbon, Madame Junot had ridiculed Carlota Joaquina both for her manner of acting and for her dressing, and she had slain her as an extremely ugly woman.

Princess of Brazil

In 1788, when his eldest brother Joseph, Prince of Brazil died, Infante John became the first in line to his mother's throne. Soon he received the titles Prince of Brazil and 15th Duke of Braganza. Between 1788 and 1816, Carlota Joaquina was known as Princess of Brazil as the wife of the heir-apparent of the Portuguese throne. Some scholars believe that she has had a rough and superficial behavior, attributing to her the fact that she hated Brazil.

His religious observances bored her, and they were quite incompatible. Nevertheless, she gave birth to nine children during their marriage and, because they were all handsome, it was rumoured that especially the younger ones had a different father. 

After Queen Maria I became insane in 1792, Prince John took over the government in her name, even though he only took the title of Prince Regent in 1799. This change in events suited Carlota Joaquina's ambitious and sometimes violent nature. In the Portuguese court she would interfere frequently in matters of state, trying to influence the decisions of her husband; this attempts to meddling in politics displeased the Portuguese nobility and even the population.

Because she was excluded from the government decisions many times, Carlota Joaquina organized a plot with the intention to take the reins of power from the Prince Regent, arresting him and declaring that he was incapable of rule like his mother.

However, in 1805 this plot was discovered; the Count of Vila Verde proposed the opening of an investigation and the arrest of all those involved, but Carlota Joaquina was saved because her husband, wishing to avoid a public scandal, opposed to her arrest, preferring to confine his wife to Queluz Palace and Ramalhão Palace, while he himself moved to Mafra Palace, effectively separating from her. At that time Carlota Joaquina's enemies claimed that she had bought a retreat where she indulged in sexual orgies.

In Brazil 
In 1807, the Portuguese royal family left Portugal for Brazil because of the Napoleonic invasion.

While in Brazil, Carlota Joaquina made attempts to obtain the administration of the Spanish dominions in Hispanic America, a project known as Carlotism. Spain itself was controlled by Napoleon and its kings, her father and brother Ferdinand, were held by Napoleon in France. Carlota Joaquina regarded herself as the heiress of her captured family. Allegedly among her plans was to send armies to occupy Buenos Aires and northern Argentina to style herself "Queen of La Plata". The Portuguese-Brazilian forces, however, only managed to temporarily annex the eastern banks of the Rio de la Plata as Cisplatina, which were kept in the Empire of Brazil after 1822 and seceded in 1828 as the Republic of Uruguay.

Queen 

When the Portuguese royal family returned to Portugal in 1821 after an absence of 14 years, Carlota Joaquina met a country that had changed much since their departure. In 1807, Portugal had lived stably under absolutism. Napoleonic troops and political attitudes fostered by Spain's Cortes of Cádiz had brought revolutionary ideas to Portugal. In 1820, a liberal revolution commenced in Porto. A constitutional Cortes Gerais had been promulgated, and in 1821 it gave Portugal its first constitution. The queen had arch-conservative positions and wanted a reactionary response in Portugal. Her husband, however, did not want to renege on his vows to uphold the constitution. Carlota Joaquina made an alliance with her youngest son Miguel, who shared his mother's conservative views. In 1824, using Miguel's position as army commander, they took power and held the king a virtual prisoner in the palace, where the queen tried to make him abdicate in favor of Miguel. The king received British help against his wife and son and regained power, finally compelling his son to leave the country. The queen had also to go briefly into exile.

King John VI lived in Bemposta Palace and Queen Carlota Joaquina in Queluz. Though she lived there quietly, she became decidedly eccentric in dress and behaviour. However, their eldest son Pedro, left behind as regent in Brazil, was proclaimed and crowned on 1 December 1822 as its independent Emperor. John VI refused to accept this until he was persuaded by the British to do so, signing in August 1825 the Treaty of Rio de Janeiro by which he and Carlota Joaquina were granted the honorific title of Emperors of Brasil. He died in March 1826. Claiming ill-health, Carlota Joaquina refused to visit his deathbed and started the rumour that her husband had been poisoned by the Freemasons.

Pedro, Emperor of Brazil, now became King of Portugal as well, but knowing that carrying out the duties of both positions would be impossible, Pedro abdicated in Portugal and made his eldest daughter Maria the Queen of Portugal as well as betrothing her to Miguel, his younger brother. In the meantime, Carlota Joaquina's daughter, the Infanta Isabel Maria was to be Regent in Portugal instead of Carlota Joaquina, who ordinarily would have held such a post as Queen Dowager. About two years later the little queen set out for Portugal, only to find upon arrival at Gibraltar that her uncle and fiancé had not only removed the regent, but declared himself King of Portugal.

Queen Carlota Joaquina died at the Queluz Royal Palace, outside of Sintra. It is speculated whether she died because of natural causes or whether she, in fact, killed herself.

Issue

Carlota Joaquina married King João VI of Portugal in 1785 and had nine children.

Carlota in film and television
After her death, Carlota Joaquina (mainly in Brazil) became part of popular culture and an important historical figure, being the subject of several books, films and other media.

 Carlota Joaquina, Princess of Brazil (1994) – Feature film directed by Carla Camurati, tells a summarized tale, mixing history with legend, of the Princess's life, from her childhood until her (mythical) suicide. Marieta Severo plays adult Carlota, while Ludmila Dayer portrays her as a child.
 O Quinto dos Infernos (2003) – Betty Lago portrays Carlota in this television miniseries produced by Rede Globo, telling the story of how the Portuguese Royal Family escaped to Brazil.
 Liberdade, Liberdade (2016) - Susana Ribeiro portrays Carlota in this Globo telenovela that eventually features the Portuguese Royal family going to Brazil.
 Novo Mundo (2017) - Débora Olivieri portrays Carlota in this Globo telenovela set in 1817 Brazil.

Ancestors

References

Further reading 

 Azevedo, Francisca Nogueira de. Carlota Joaquina na Corte do Brasil. Rio de Janeiro: Civilização Brasileira, 2003.
 Azevedo, Francisca Nogueira de. Carlota Joaquina: cartas inéditas. Rio de Janeiro, Casa da Palavra, 2007.
 Cassotti, Marsilio. Carlota Joaquina – o Pecado Espanhol. Lisboa, A Esfera dos Livros, 2009.
 Cheke, Marcus. Carlota Joaquina: Queen of Portugal. London: Sidgwick & Jackson,  1947
(Portuguese) Carlota Joaquina, a Rainha Intrigante; tradução de Gulnara Lobato de Morais Pereira. Rio de Janeiro: José Olympio, 1949.
 Lima, Oliveira. D. João VI no Brasil. Topbooks.
 Pereira, Sara Marques (1999), D. Carlota Joaquina e os Espelhos de Clio: Actuação Política e Figurações Historiográficas, Livros Horizonte, Lisboa, 1999.
 Pereira, Sara Marques (2008), D. Carlota Joaquina Rainha de Portugal, Livros Horizonte, Lisboa, 2008.

|-

1775 births
1830 deaths
People from Aranjuez
Portuguese queens consort
Spanish infantas
House of Bourbon (Spain)
Princesses of Brazil
Duchesses of Braganza
Dames of the Order of Saint Isabel
Burials at the Monastery of São Vicente de Fora
18th-century Spanish people
19th-century Spanish people
18th-century Portuguese people
19th-century Portuguese people
18th-century Spanish women
19th-century Spanish women
18th-century Portuguese women
19th-century Portuguese women
John VI of Portugal
Daughters of kings
Portuguese people of Italian descent
Queen mothers